Clavus rugizonatus, common name the exasperating turrid, is a species of sea snail, a marine gastropod mollusk in the family Drilliidae.

Description
The length of the shell attains 9 mm.

Distribution
This is a marine species occurs off the Philippines, New Caledonia, Papua New Guinea and the Loyalty Islands.

References

 Hervier, J. (1896a) Descriptions d'espèces nouvelles de l'Archipel Néo-Calédonien. Journal de Conchyliologie, 43, p. 142 
  Kilburn R.N., Fedosov A. & Kantor Yu.I. (2014) The shallow-water New Caledonia Drilliidae of genus Clavus Montfort, 1810 (Mollusca: Gastropoda: Conoidea). Zootaxa 3818(1): 1–69

External links
 

rugizonatus
Gastropods described in 1896